Sunac China Holdings Limited, or Sunac, is a major property developer headquartered in Tianjin, China. The company focuses on large-scale, medium to high-end property developments. It does not only focus on its home market of Tianjin, but also has operations in Beijing, Chongqing, Wuxi and other cities.

In July 2017, Sunac reached a $9.3 billion deal to buy Dalian Wanda's tourism projects and hotels, forming the second-biggest real estate deal ever in China at the time.

History 
Sunac was founded in 2003 in Tianjin by Sun Hongbin, previously the founder, chairman, and CEO of Sunco Group. It was listed on the Hong Kong stock exchange on 7 October 2010 with the IPO price of HK$3.48 per share.

In July 2017, Sunac acquired 13 tourism projects from Dalian Wanda for US$6.6 billion The company also acquired a stake in Chinese streaming service le.com in 2017.

In March 2020, the company reported profits of $3.7 billion in 2019, an increase of 57% from the previous year.

In April 2022, Sunac was among stocks that were suspended from trading after missing the deadline to report annual results, due to the 2020–2022 Chinese property sector crisis.

Corporate affairs
The company has an office in One Central (使馆壹) in Dongcheng District, Beijing, and one in Magnetic Plaza (奥城商业广场) in Nankai District, Tianjin.

References

External links 

Real estate companies of China
Companies based in Tianjin
Real estate companies established in 2003
Companies listed on the Hong Kong Stock Exchange
Offshore companies of the Cayman Islands